The Fiddler's Dream is a folk / folk-rock album by Dransfield, a short-lived group principally comprising the Dransfield brothers, Robin and Barry. Originally released as an LP in 1976 by Transatlantic, catalogue number TRA 322, featuring cover illustrations by Paul Ellis.

The album was produced by Brian Harrison and recorded at Livingstone Studio, Barnet during March and April 1976. Engineer was Nic Kinsey.

Track listing 
All tracks composed by Barry Dransfield except "The Alchemist and the Pedlar" by Robin and Barry Dransfield and "It's Dark in Here" by Robin Dransfield. "The Blacksmith" is very loosely based on the folk-song of the same name.

Up to Now
Up to Now 4:15
The Blacksmith 1 2:45
Losers and Winners
The Alchemist and the Pedlar 7:30
It's Dark in Here 4:07
The Handsome Meadow Boy 6:07
The Fool
The Fool's Song 3:46
The Ballad of Dickie Lubber 4:37
The Beginning of the Never Ending
The Blacksmith 2 2:27
What Will We Tell Them? 2:30
Violin 6:38

Personnel 
Barry Dransfield - Vocals, electric and acoustic fiddles, electric dulcimer, cello, guitar, zither
Robin Dransfield - Vocals, guitar
Brian Harrison - Vocals, bass guitar, organ, piano

with

Charlie Smith - Drums

References

1976 albums
Folk albums by British artists